Holarrhena is a genus of plant in the family Apocynaceae first described as a genus in 1810. It is native to tropical and southern Africa as well as south, east, and southeast Asia.  the World Checklist of Selected Plant Families recognises 5 species:

Species
 Holarrhena congolensis Stapf - Zaïre
 Holarrhena curtisii King & Gamble - Indochina
 Holarrhena floribunda (G.Don) T.Durand & Schinz - western + central Africa
 Holarrhena mitis (Vahl) R.Br. ex Roem. & Schult. - Sri Lanka
 Holarrhena pubescens Wall. - eastern, southern + central Africa; Indian Subcontinent, Indochina, parts of China

References

 
Apocynaceae genera